John F. Tefft (born August 16, 1949) is an American diplomat who has served as a Foreign Service Officer since 1972. He was confirmed as the United States Ambassador to Russia on July 31, 2014. He had previously served as the United States' ambassador to Ukraine, Georgia, and Lithuania.

Early life and education 
Tefft was born in Madison, Wisconsin. He earned a Bachelor of Arts degree from Marquette University and a Master of Arts in history from Georgetown University.

Career
Tefft is a career member of the Senior Foreign Service, with the personal rank of Minister-Counselor. He joined the United States Foreign Service in 1972 and has served in Jerusalem, Budapest, Rome, Moscow, Vilnius, Tbilisi, and Kyiv.

Until his appointment as ambassador to Georgia, he was the deputy Assistant Secretary of State for European Affairs since July 6, 2004. Tefft also served as International Affairs Advisor (Deputy Commandant) of the National War College in Washington, D.C. From 2000 to 2003, he was the United States Ambassador to Lithuania. He served as deputy Chief of Mission at the U.S. Embassy in Moscow from 1996 to 1999 (when Pickering was ambassador), and was chargé d'affaires at the Embassy from November 1996 to September 1997. Tefft served as Director of the Office of Northern European Affairs from 1992 to 1994, Deputy Director of the Office of Soviet Union (later Russian and CIS) Affairs from 1989 to 1992, and Counselor for Political-Military Affairs at the U.S. Embassy in Rome from 1986 to 1989. 
His other foreign assignments included Budapest and Jerusalem, as well as service on the U.S. delegation to the START I arms control negotiations in 1985.

Ambassador to Ukraine 
On September 30, 2009, President Barack Obama nominated Tefft as the ambassador to Ukraine. He was confirmed by the U.S. Senate on November 20, 2009.

Tefft arrived in Ukraine on December 2, 2009, and President Viktor Yushchenko accepted Tefft's credentials of Ambassador Extraordinary and Plenipotentiary on December 7, 2009. The ambassador expressed his hope for fruitful cooperation. Tefft delivered his speech in Ukrainian.

On February 26, 2013, President Obama nominated Geoffrey R. Pyatt to succeed Tefft as Ambassador of the United States to Ukraine. Pyatt was sworn in on July 30, 2013, and arrived in Ukraine on August 3, 2013.

Ambassador to Russia 
In July 2014, President Obama nominated Tefft as the United States Ambassador to Russia in Moscow, after receiving Russia's approval.
The Senate confirmed Tefft in a voice vote on July 31, 2014. The confirmation followed several attempts as a number of ambassadorial appointments were being held up at the time. Strained relations with Russia over pro-separatist activity in eastern Ukraine, the country's annexation of Crimea, and the alleged shooting down of a commercial airliner, prompted senators to finally approve the nomination. He presented his credentials to President Vladimir Putin on November 19, 2014, and left the position on September 28, 2017.

In 2016, the Russian governor of the Samara Oblast, Nikolay Merkushkin, advised AvtoVAZagregat employees for help in paying wages and appeals to US Ambassador John Tefft.

Awards

Tefft has received a number of awards, including the State Department Distinguished Honor Award in 1992 and the DCM of the Year Award for his service in Moscow in 1999. He received Presidential Meritorious Service Awards in 2001 and 2005.

See also

List of ambassadors of the United States

References

External links

Tefft's testimony on Ukraine, Dec 2004
Bio and photo

|-

|-

|-

1949 births
Ambassadors of the United States to Georgia (country)
Ambassadors of the United States to Lithuania
Ambassadors of the United States to Russia
Ambassadors of the United States to Ukraine
Georgetown University Graduate School of Arts and Sciences alumni
Living people
Marquette University alumni
Recipients of St. George's Order of Victory
People from Madison, Wisconsin
United States Foreign Service personnel
21st-century American diplomats